Walsall Courier and South Staffordshire Gazette is the earliest known newspaper to serve Walsall in the ancient county of Staffordshire, now the West Midlands.

Established in 1855, it was published by Newey & Foster of New Street. It was a weekly newspaper and only lasted one year before the Walsall Guardian and District Advertiser was established in 1856.

References
British History Online: Walsall - Social Life

Walsall
Publications established in 1855
1856 disestablishments
Defunct newspapers published in the United Kingdom
1855 establishments in England